Panguni Uthiram (Tamil:பங்குனி உத்திரம்) is a Tamil Hindu festival and day of importance to Tamils. Panguni Uthiram is a famous festival and special to Murugan, Ayyappa, Shiva and Vishnu devotees. It falls on the day the moon transits in the asterism or nakshatram of  Uthiram (tamil) in the twelfth month Panguni (பங்குனி) of the Tamil calendar. It is the Purnima or full moon of the month of Panguni (பங்குனி 14 March - 13 April). This coincides with the Hindu calendar month of Phalguna / Chaitra. Panguni is also the last month of Solar Tamil Calendar year after which the next New Tamil year starts.

Significance 

This month is special because the Uthiram nakshatram coincides with the full moon. This full moon signifies the marriage of Parvati and Parameswara (Lord Shiva), Murugan and Deivanai, and Aandaal (Kothai) and Rangamannar. On Panguni Uthiram, Narayana marries Komalavalli Naachiyar and gave Kalyana Kola Seva to his Bhakthas. Again, Valmiki's Ramayana says it is on this day and star that Sita's marriage with Rama was celebrated. The Brahmanda Puranam indicates that on Panguni Uthiram, all holy water joins Thumburu teertha (also spelt as Tirtha), one of seven sacred tanks in Tirupati Tirumala. It is the Jayanti (day of incarnation) of Lord Ayyappan.

The almighty manifests in the marital state as Uma Maheswara, Sita Rama, and Radha Krishna – despite his changelessness, sans childhood or youth or old age - and is celebrated by devotees. On this day, Goddess Mahalakshmi incarnated on earth from the ocean of milk (after the ocean was churned by the Gods and the demons) and hence, it is also celebrated as Mahalakshmi Jayanti. On this day, Goddess Parvati in the form of Gowri married Lord Shiva in Kanchipuram and hence, this day is also celebrated as the Gowri Kalyanam day.

Festivals

On Panguni Uthiram, in all the places where Lord Subrahmanya has a temple, the devotees carry a kavadi for the fulfillment of vows. Devotees flock in hundreds to all the Murugan temples for the Panguni Uthiram festival, which is celebrated in March every year.

The day of Panguni Uthiram is of special significance to the worship of earth element, Prithvi lingam of Ekambareswarar Temple at Kanchipuram, Tamil Nadu. where festivities last for 13 days.

Panguni month Uthiram nakshatram coincides with the full moon is also the festival of Holi, celebrating the arrival of spring, the festival of colors, the end of winter, and for many it's a festive day to meet others, play and laugh, blossoming of love and marriage. Hiranyakashbu's sister Holika tried to burn Prahalada and got burnt herself, Krishna and Radha play with colors. Hence the day is important for Vaishnavism, Shaivism, Kaumaram and Shaktism.

References

External links
 About the festival

Hindu festivals
Tamil festivals
Festivals in Tamil Nadu
March observances
April observances
Religious festivals in India
Observances held on the full moon